Sasural Simar Ka 2 is an Indian Hindi-language television series that premiered on 26 April 2021 on Colors TV. It is a spiritual sequel to the 2011 soap opera Sasural Simar Ka. Produced by Rashmi Sharma Telefilms, it stars Radhika Muthukumar, Avinash Mukherjee, Tanya Sharma and Karan Sharma.

Plot
Set in Agra, the story revolves around Simar and Reema Narayan, two sisters with different personalities. While Simar dreams of becoming a singer, Reema aspires to be a model. Aarav Oswal and Vivaan Oswal are cousins who love and respect one another. They fall for Reema, but Simar falls for Aarav. Reema is chosen to be his bride but leaves on the wedding day for an event for her modeling career. Simar instead is requested to marry Aarav, but the Oswals reject her. Geetanjali fixes Vivan's marriage with Reema.

After a lot of trials the Oswals finally accept Simar as their daughter-in-law. However Simar and Aarav's relationship is jeopardise when Arav's old friend Dhami enters their lives. Dhami is obsessed with Aarav and claims to be his first wife. It turned out that Dhami is mentally unstable. She druged Aarav and married him. Simar tries to expose Dhami but all her plans backfire. On Gitangali devi's birthday Dhami showed picture of Gopichand (Gitangali devi's husband) and his second wife who is actually Simar's music teacher Yamini. Simar left her musical career for Gitangali devi. Dhami decided to commit suicide with Aarav, however Simar saves Aarav and died after falling from a cliff.

Reema left Oawal mansion to complete her modeling career. However when she returned she started acting strangely. Simar worried about Reema's behaviour decided to investigate and found out that Reema has been captured by a Yaksh named Rudra, and the one pretending to be Reema is actually Chaya, a lookalike of Reema and Rudra's wife. Simar freed Reema and bring her back. However it turned out that Chaya had swap place with Reema. Rudra learns that Simar is the reincarnation of Rani Yakshini Damini, the most powerful Yakshini. Rudra tries everything to prevent Simar from remembering her past and attaining the power of Damini. However Simar manege to destroyed Rudra.

On their first wedding anniversary Aarav wanted to gift Simar something special. He saw a bangle which was in a statue's hand. The state had a burned mark on it so no one was willing to buy it. However Aarav liked appreciate it. The Statue turned out to be cursed. It killed everyone one who disgust it. Reema after doing some research came to know that the statue was made by a man named Arindam, who was the heir of a famous bengali family, the Roy Chaudary's. Arindam was in love with a maid named Labuni. However the Roy Chaudary's refused their relationship and threw Labuni into fire. Labuni escaped but her face was scared. Arindam had made a statue similar to Labuni and now Labuni's soul residues in the Statue looking from someone who would love her despite the scar on her face. The man happened to be Aarav and Labuni plot to marry him in order to become alive. Labuni tried everything she can to marry Aarav. However Simar manege to burn the Statue. Labuni returns in her human form to marry Aarav. She becomes Geet's nanny and frame Simar for a murder. Aarav proves Simar's innocence destroyed Labuni.

Gajendra had a daughter Masoomi, from his girlfriend before his marriage with Sandhya. He had been raising her secretly in an orphanage for 25 years. A priest told Gitangali devi about a sin committed by one of the family members. To repent for the "sin" Gitanjali devi distribute food to a orphanage which happens to be the same orphanage where Masoomi stays. Gajendra's truth comes out and everyone hated him except Simar. Masoomi overhears the conversation between Gajendra Simar and Aarav. She came to know about her father and elope after Gajendra says that he will leave Masoomi for his wife and children. Masoomi meets Sandhya on the road who brings to Oswal's Mansion. Sandhya becomes heart-broken after learning the truth and kept her distance from Gajendra. Masoomi accused Aarav of snatching her happiness by steal her father. Simar visits the orphanage to learn more about Masoomi. She learned that Masoomi had a twin sister Gunjan.A Naagin Track Start and Sandhya Died.

Cast

Main
 Radhika Muthukumar as 
 Simar Oswal (née Narayan) – A singer; Indu and Avinash's youngest daughter; Roma, Reema and Gagan's youngest sister;  Aarav's wife.(2021–present)
 Rani Yakshini Damini - Simar's past life; Dev's wife. (2022)
 Avinash Mukherjee as 
 Aarav Oswal - Sandhya and Gajendra son; Aditi's brother; Vivaan and Reyansh cousin brother; Simar's husband. (2021–present)
 Raja Dev Singh - Aarav's past life; Damini's husband. (2022)
Naag (Aarav become snake) (2023)
 Karan Sharma as Vivaan Oswal – Chitra and Giriraj's elder son; Reyansh's elder brother; Lalit, Vivek, Aarav and Aditi's cousin; Kajal's ex-fiancé; Reema's husband.  (2021–present)
 Tanya Sharma as 
Reema  Oswal (née Narayan)– Indu and Avinash's second daughter; Roma's younger sister; Gagan and Simar's elder sister; Vivaan's wife. (2021–present)
Chhaya - A soul and Rudra's wife. (2022)
 Jayati Bhatia as Geetanjali Devi "Badi Maa" Oswal – Nirmala's twin sister; Gopichand's widow; Shobha, Gajendra and Giriraj's mother; Rajendra, Sandhya and Chitra's mother-in-law; Aarav, Aditi, Vivaan, Reyansh, Lalit and Vivek's grandmother; Simar and Reema's grandmother-in-law; Geet's maternal great-grandmother. (2021–present)

Recurring
 Sumit Bhardwaj as Samar Khanna – Music composer; Yamini Devi's adoptive son; Simar's ex-fiancé. (2021–2022)
 Shakti Singh as Professor Avinash Narayan – Indu's husband; Roma, Reema, Gagan and Simar's father; Aditi, Aarav, Vivaan and Lalit's father-in-law; Geet's parental grandfather. (2021–present)
 Anita Kulkarni as Indu Narayan – Avinash's wife; Roma, Reema, Gagan and Simar's mother; Aditi, Aarav, Vivaan and Lalit's mother-in-law; Geet's parental grandmother. (2021–present)
 Aarav Chowdhary as Gajendra Oswal – Geetanjali and Gopichand's elder son; Shobha younger brother; Giriraj's elder brother; Charulata's ex boyfriend; Sandhya's widower; Gunjan, Masoomi, Aarav and Aditi's father; Gagan And Simar's father-in-law; Geet's maternal grandfather. (2021–present)
 Shital Thakkar / Moon Banerjee as Sandhya Oswal – Gajendra's wife; Aarav and Aditi's mother; Gagan and Simar's mother-in-law; Geet's maternal grandmother. (2021–2022) / (2023)(Dead)
 Vibha Bhagat as Chitra Oswal – Giriraj's wife; Vivaan and Reyansh's mother; Reema and Kavya's mother-in-law. (2021–present)
 Rajeev Paul as Giriraj Oswal – Geetanjali and Gopichand's younger son; Shobha and Gajendra's younger brother; Chitra's husband; Vivaan and Reyansh's father; Reema And Kavya's father-in-law. (2021–present)
 Akash Jagga / Rupesh Kotwani as Gagan Narayan – Indu and Avinash's son; Roma and Reema's younger brother; Simar's elder brother; Aditi's Husband; Geet's father. (2021–2022) / (2023–present)
 Rakshit Wahi as Reyansh Oswal – Chitra and Giriraj's younger son; Vivaan's younger brother; Ishita's ex-husband; Kavya's husband. (2021–present)
 Shubhanshi Singh Raghuvanshi as Aditi Gagan Narayan (nee' Oswal) – Sandhya and Gajendra's daughter; Aarav's younger sister; Gagan's wife; Mayank's ex-wife; Geet's mother. (2021–present)
 Salman Shaikh as Devesh Agarwal – Reema's photographer. (2021–2022)
 Dolphin Dwivedi Dubey as Yamini Devi Oswal – Classical singer; Gopichand's second widow; Samar's adoptive mother; Geetanjali’s enemy; Simar's former guru. (2021–2022)
 Leena Prabhu as Shobha Kashyap (nee' Oswal) – Geetanjali and Gopichand's daughter; Gajendra and Giriraj's elder sister; Dr. Rajendra's wife; Lalit and Vivek's mother; Roma and Divya's mother-in-law. (2021–2022)
 Shubhangi Tambale as Roma Kashyap (nee' Narayan) – Indu and Avinash's eldest daughter; Reema, Gagan and Simar's elder sister; Lalit's wife. (2021–present)
 Wasim Mushtaq as Lalit Kashyap – Shobha and Dr. Rajendra's elder son; Vivek's younger brother; Roma's husband. (2021–2022)
 Avinash Sahijwani as Dr. Rajendra Kashyap – Shobha's husband; Lalit and Vivek's father; Roma and Divya's father-in-law. (2021–2022)
 Prithvi Tanwar as Vivek Kashyap – Shobha and Dr. Rajendra's younger son; Lalit's brother; Divya's husband. (2021–present)
 Giriraj Kabra as Mohit – A local goon; Aditi's ex-fiancé. (2021–2022)
 Sneha Tomar as Kajal Gupta – Surinder's daughter; Vivaan's ex-fiancée. (2021)
 Kamal Ghimiral as Surinder Gupta – Oswals' business associate; Kajal's father. (2021)
 Sonam Arora as Bhavna – Brothel owner. (2022)
 Kamal Malik as Rana – Mohit's father; The man who want to buy Aditi. (2022)
 Adi Irani as Gopichand Oswal – Geetanjali and Yamini's deceased husband; Gajendra, Giriraj and Shobha's father; Aarav, Aditi, Vivaan, Reyansh, Lalit and Vivek's grandfather. (2021)
 Krutika Desai as Dhami Kapoor – Aarav's psycho friend turned second wife. (2022)
 Manish Arora as Doctor. (2022)
 Nishi Singh as Ishita ‘Ishu’ Kapoor - Reyansh's ex-wife; Karan and Pallavi's daughter. (2022)
 Neha Harsora as Kavya Oswal - Reyansh's wife; Simar's friend and student. (2022–present)
 Krishna Soni as Karan Kapoor - Ishita's father; Pallavi's husband. (2022)
 Heena Soni as Pallavi Karan Kapoor - Ishita's mother; Karan's wife. (2022)
 Ashish Kapoor / Kapil Arya as Rudra Rathore - Chhaya's husband; Mayakshi's elder brother; Kamakshi's son; a yaksh. (2022)
 Farah Lakhani as Mayakshi Rathore - Rudra's younger sister; Kamakshi's daughter; a yakshini. (2022)
 Arina Dey as Kamakshi Rathore - Rudra and Mayakshi's mother; a yakshini. (2022)
 Sonam Lamba as Labuni - An evil statue who tried to marry Aarav to become alive. (2022)
 Vishal Bharadwaj as Arindam - Labuni's love interest; a man who made Labuni's statue. (2022–2023)
 Dubroo Clown as Joker - The Evil soft toy; Arindam’s friend. (2022–2023) 
 Payal Bhojwani as Gunjan Oswal (Evil spirit) / Masoomi Oswal - Gajendra and Charulata's twin daughters. (2023)
 Kajal Pisal as Charulata - Gajendra's ex-girlfriend; Gunjan and Masoomi's mother; a witch. (2023)
 Akshita Sethi as Tara - a witch. (2023)
 Tushar Kawale as Suraj. (2023)
 Shraddha Jaiswal as Lavanya-Naagin (2023-present)

Guests
2 cast members from former season (season one), were seen in the episodes during April to June 2021, to introduce the main characters.
Cast from other tv series have also been seen for promotion of their series.

 Dipika Kakar as Simar Bharadwaj – Prem's wife; Roli's sister; Nirmala's granddaughter-in-law. (2021)
 Jayati Bhatia as Nirmala Devi "Mataji" Bharadwaj – Geetanjali's twin sister; Prem's grandmother; Simar's grandmother-in-law. (2021)
 Vivian Dsena as Ranveer Oberoi from Sirf Tum (2021)
 Jaya Prada as Herself (2022)
 Eisha Singh as Suhani Sharma from Sirf Tum (2022)

Production
Filming of the series began on 19 March 2021.

Casting 
Via first promo, Dipika Kakar was confirmed to be reprising her role of Simar Bhardwaj. Later it was revealed to be a cameo of 50 episodes. Jayati Bhatia was signed to reprise her role as Mataji in cameo and play a new role of Badi Maa. Avinash Mukherjee, Tanya Sharma, Radhika Muthukumar and Karan Sharma were selected for new leads.

Aarav Chowdhary, Sheetal Thakkar, Vibha Bhagat, Rakshit Wahi, Rajeev Paul, Leena Prabhu, Anita Kulkarni, Akash Jagga,  Shakti Singh and Shubhangi Tambale were cast for recurring roles of the show. Rakshit Wahi quit the show in 2021 but came back in June 2022. In March 2022, Jaya Prada to join as a cameo for Gajendra and Sandhya's wedding anniversary. Wasim Mushtaq quit the show in April 2022.
In August 2022, the storyline changed to a Supernatural Family Drama, just like in the first season.

Filming
Set against the backdrop of Agra, the series is mainly filmed at the sets in Naigaon, Maharashtra. In April, May and June 2021, several sequences were shot near the Taj Mahal in Agra due to the lockdown in Maharashtra.

References

External links
 

Indian television soap operas
2021 Indian television series debuts
Colors TV original programming
Indian drama television series
Hindi-language television shows
Television shows set in Agra